The 2019 Winter Deaflympics, officially known as the 19th Winter Deaflympics or XIX Winter Deaflympics, was the 19th edition of the Winter Deaflympics, and took place between the 12–21 December in Sondrio Province in Northern Italy. The opening ceremony was held in Sondrio on 12 December and curling competition began a day prior to the start of the Winter Deaflympics. Sporting events apart from curling commenced on 13 December.

36 events took place in 6 sports: alpine skiing, chess, cross-country skiing, curling, ice hockey, and snowboarding. Initially 32 sporting events were slated to be held but three more events were added to the competition by the organisers due to the inclusion of chess, which was a surprise move. Chess made its debut at the 2019 Winter Deaflympics.

The 19th Deaflympics were the second time Italy hosted the event, previously hosting the 1983 games in Madonna di Campiglio. The Deaflympics was organised by the Federazione Sport Sordi Italia, the national deaf sports federation in Italy, affiliated with the International Committee of Sports for the Deaf.

Background 
The hosting of the event raised concerns in May 2018 following the house arrest of former ICSD President Valery Rukhledev on 23 May 2018 regarding the embezzlement of $803,800 from the All-Russian Society of the Deaf while he was serving as the post of the society as well as the post of ICSD President. Valery Rukhledev later stepped down from the position on 31 July 2018 and he later replaced by Australian Rebecca Adam for the ICSD Presidential position on 1 August 2018 causing further controversy as top Deaf sports movements criticised the appointment of Rebecca Adam without proper consent and approval.

On 13 September 2018, on a press release the newly appointed ICSD President Rebecca Adam confirmed that the Winter Deaflympic event would take place as planned and scheduled during December 2019.

Bidding 
It was revealed that in around 2017, former ICSD President Valery Rukhledev had encouraged and requested an application for Almaty, Kazakhstan, after the successful 2017 Winter Universiade, held at the city. However Almaty had not submitted its application to host Winter Deaflympics and instead Italy was chosen as the host country.

After the ousting of Valery Rukhledev, on 14 June 2018, the ICSD and FSSI had a meeting and unanimously agreed to support to stage the 2019 Winter Deaflympics in Italy despite the crisis in the administration of ICSD which started from May 2018.

The Games

Opening ceremony
The opening ceremony was held on 12 December 2019. The event was officially opened by the Sondrio Province mayor Marco Scaramellini and Italian singer Silvia Mezzanotte sung the national anthem of host country, Italy. Former three time alpine skiing Olympic gold medalist Deborah Compagnoni was invited as special guest during the opening ceremony.

Venues 
Three venues were selected to host the sporting events. Santa Caterina di Valfurva hosts three sporting disciplines such as alpine skiing, snowboarding and cross-country skiing. Madesimo hosts curling competitions while Chiavenna was chosen to host ice hockey and chess events.

Participating nations

Sports 
The 2019 Winter Deaflympics featured 36 events over 6 sports. Chess was the only new event, and all other sporting events which were part of the 2015 edition were retained. The original idea was that there was a women's ice hockey tournament, but the International Committee of Sports for the Deaf has cancelled the event due to the low number of countries registered on it.

 
 
 

 Skiing

Calendar

Medal table

References

External links 

 
2019 Winter
International sports competitions hosted by Italy
Sports competitions in Milan
Parasports in Italy
Winter Deaflympics
Winter Deaflympics
Multi-sport events in Italy
Winter Deaflympics